Nicholas Monroe and Jack Sock were the defending champions, but chose not to participate this year.

Elias Ymer and Mikael Ymer won the title, defeating Mate Pavić and Michael Venus in the final, 6–1, 6–1.

Seeds

Draw

Draw

References
 Main Draw

Doubles